Pseudonoorda rubricostalis is a moth in the family Crambidae. It was described by George Hampson in 1910. It is found in the Democratic Republic of the Congo (Kasai-Occidental, Katanga), Namibia, Zambia and Zimbabwe.

References

Moths described in 1910
Odontiinae